Grey Gardens is a 1975 documentary.

Grey Gardens may also refer to:

 Grey Gardens (estate), the estate where Edith Ewing Bouvier Beale spent most of her life
 Grey Gardens (2009 film), a 2009 adaptation of the documentary, starring Drew Barrymore and Jessica Lange
 Grey Gardens (musical), a stage musical based on the documentary, first produced in 2006
 Donald Gray Gardens, a part of the Great Lakes Exposition in Cleveland, Ohio
 "Grey Gardens", a song by Rufus Wainwright on the 2001 album Poses
 Grey Wardens, a warrior order in the BioWare video game Dragon Age